Amri or AMRI may refer to:

Peoples and culture
 Amri culture, associated with archaeological sites in Sindh and Balochistan, Pakistan
 Amri language, spoken by the Karbi people of Assam and Meghalaya, India
 Amri people, an ethnic group of Sudan

Individual people
Abdulelah Al-Amri (born 1997), a Saudi Arabian footballer
Abdul Rahman al-Amri (1973–2007), Saudi who died at Guantanamo Bay
Ali Al-Amri (born 1987), a Saudi Arabian long-distance runner
Ali Al-Amri (footballer) (born 1989), an Emirati footballer
Aziz El Amri (born 1950), a Moroccan football coach
Chadli Amri (born 1984), Algerian footballer
Hassan al-Amri (1920–1988), Yemeni politician
Hassan Al-Amri (footballer) (born 1994), a Saudi Arabian footballer
Khairul Amri (born 1985), a Singapore international footballer
Khairul Amri (footballer, born 1989)
Majed Al-Amri (born 1985), a Saudi Arabian footballer
Marwa Amri (born 1989), a Tunisian freestyle wrestler
Mohamed Hedi El Amri (1906–1978), a Tunisian historian and writer
Mohammed Al-Amri, (born 1991), a Saudi Arabian footballer
Muhammad Musa al-Amri (born 1965), a Yemeni politician
Mohamed Naif Mubarak Ali Al Amri (born 1988), an Emirati footballer
Othman Hadi Al Maqboul al-Amri, a Saudi Arabian suspected terrorist
Raed Al-Amri (born 1989), a Saudi Arabian footballer
Saleh Al-Amri (born 1993), a Saudi Arabian footballer
Salem Amri (born 1948), an Algerian footballer
Tariq Al-Amri (born 1990), a Saudi Arabian long-distance runner
Anis Amri, perpetrator of the 2016 Berlin truck attack

Places
 ‘Amri, Yemen
 Amri, Sindh, an ancient settlement in modern-day Sindh, Pakistan
 Amreh, Sari, also known as Amrī, Mazandaran Province, Iran
 Amri railway station, Pakistan

Other uses
 AMRI Global (Albany Molecular Research Inc.), a contract research and manufacturing organization
 AMRI Hospitals, a private hospital chain in India

See also

Ameri (disambiguation)